Rautakirja Oy was a Finnish company operating subsidiary businesses such as R-kioski.

Rautakirja Oy operates in Finland, Estonia, Latvia, Lithuania, Romania, Germany and Russia. Rautakirja Oy owns the Estonian company AS Rautakirja Estonia.

On the 25 August 2011, it was announced that Rautakirja will sell the Suomalainen Kirjakauppa segment of its business to Otava for in excess of 27 million euro.

References

Retail companies of Finland
Companies formerly listed on Nasdaq Helsinki